Pedro Magallanes (born June 14, 1956) is a retired Argentine football (soccer) midfielder who played professionally in Argentina and the United States.

Magallanes had an extensive career in Argentina.  He played the 1978-1979 season with Independiente and he has also played for Rosario Central and Talleres de Córdoba.  He played for Argentinos Juniors during the 1980-1981 season.  He also played for Racing Club and Loma Negra.  In 1988, he moved north to the USA where he had an unsuccessful trial with the San Diego Sockers of the Major Indoor Soccer League.  However, he joined the Hamilton Steelers of the Canadian Soccer League.  In July 1988, the Steelers loaned Magallanes to the Vancouver 86ers.  In May 1989, the Fort Lauderdale Strikers of the American Soccer League signed Magallanes.  On June 17, 1989, Jean Harbor struck Magallanes in the face, breaking his cheekbone during a game between the Strikers and the Washington Diplomats. In 1997, Magallanes served briefly as an assistant coach with the Tampa Bay Mutiny of Major League Soccer and then coached for the soccer club Classic SC.

References

1956 births
Living people
American Professional Soccer League players
American Soccer League (1988–89) players
Argentine footballers
Argentine expatriate footballers
Argentine football managers
Argentinos Juniors footballers
Canadian Soccer League (1987–1992) players
Club Atlético Independiente footballers
Fort Lauderdale Strikers (1988–1994) players
Hamilton Steelers (1981–1992) players
Racing Club de Avellaneda footballers
Rosario Central footballers
Talleres de Córdoba footballers
Vancouver Whitecaps (1986–2010) players
Association football midfielders
Expatriate soccer players in Canada
Argentine expatriate sportspeople in Canada
Expatriate soccer players in the United States
Argentine expatriate sportspeople in the United States